The Finnish Association for Nature Conservation (FANC) (in Finnish: Suomen luonnonsuojeluliitto  (SLL) is the largest non-governmental organization for environmental protection and nature conservation in Finland with over  34,000 members. It was established in 1938, but the oldest local member association, The Kuopio Nature Friends Association, is over 110 years old (founded in 1896).

Major work 
The major themes of environmental work include: 
 forest protection
 climate change prevention and sustainable energy policy
 mire and water protection
 sustainable production and consumption and ecological fiscal reform
 management and protection of cultural landscapes
 land use issues and protection of endangered species
 waste policy and chemicals
 hosting the European EKOenergy Secretariat

Publications 
Suomen Luonto (Nature of Finland) is published by the Finnish Association for Nature Conservation. It is Finland's largest nature magazine.

Logo 
In the logo is the Saimaa ringed seal, an endemic animal (only in Finland). Its future is endangered.

References 

Nature conservation organisations based in Finland